Uncommon Dissent: Intellectuals Who Find Darwinism Unconvincing is a 2004 anthology edited by William A. Dembski in which fifteen intellectuals, eight of whom are leading intelligent design proponents associated with the Discovery Institute's Center for Science and Culture (CSC) and the International Society for Complexity, Information and Design (ISCID), criticise "Darwinism" and make a case for intelligent design. It is published by the publishing wing of the paleoconservative Intercollegiate Studies Institute.  The foreword is by John Wilson, editor of the evangelical Christian magazine Christianity Today.  The title is a pun on the principle of biology known as common descent. The Discovery Institute is the engine behind the intelligent design movement.

Contributors 

The fifteen dissenting intellectuals are:

 William A. Dembski, mathematician, philosopher, theologian, leading intelligent design proponent, CSC Senior Fellow, ISCID Founder
 Robert Koons, philosopher, theologian, Christian apologist, CSC Fellow, ISCID Fellow
 Phillip E. Johnson, law professor, Christian apologist, "father" of the intelligent design movement, CSC Program Advisor
 late Marcel-Paul Schützenberger, mathematician
 Nancy R. Pearcey, Christian apologist, CSC Fellow
 Edward Sisson, attorney
 J. Budziszewski, philosopher, CSC Fellow, ISCID Fellow
 Frank J. Tipler, mathematical physicist, ISCID Fellow
 Michael J. Behe, biochemist, leading intelligent design proponent, CSC Senior Fellow, ISCID Fellow
 Michael John Denton, biochemist
 James Barham, independent scholar
 Cornelius G. Hunter, biophysicist, CSC Fellow, ISCID Fellow
 Roland F. Hirsch, analytical chemist
 Christopher Michael Langan, ISCID Fellow
 David Berlinski, popular mathematics author, CSC Senior Fellow

Phillip E. Johnson's contribution is a reprint of his 1990 First Things essay "Evolution as Dogma".  Marcel-Paul Schützenberger's "The Miracles of Darwinism" is a reprint of a 1996 interview with La Recherche.  David Berlinski's "The Deniable Darwin" is a reprint of a 1996 Commentary essay, along with his responses to critics.  The other contributions were specifically commissioned for Uncommon Dissent.

In a 2004 review on its Web site, the Discovery Institute's Center for Science and Culture describes Uncommon Dissent as "a summary of the widespread attack upon Darwinism by some of today’s leading intellectuals." Mathematics professor and intelligent-design critic Jason Rosenhouse points out that the subtitle says "intellectuals", not "scientists", and adds that "[v]ery few of the contributors hold PhD's in any field related to biology. ... The ID folks are constantly telling us that evolution is failing as a scientific paradigm, and that scientists are jumping ship in droves. But when they have a chance to put together an anthology of testimonials authored by people who dissent from modern evolutionary theory, they have to resort to philosophers, lawyers or scientists who do not work in any field related to biology."

Topics addressed
The book contains four sections: Part I: A Crisis of Confidence; Part II: Darwinism's Cultural Inroads; Part III: Leaving the Darwinian Fold; and Part IV: Auditing the Books. Part I, consisting of three essays, offers opinions on why Darwinism is questioned by the public at large. Part II, consisting of four essays, discusses the authors' opinions on the effects Darwinism has had on society and culture. Part III, consisting of three essays, deals with the personal intellectual journeys of contributors Behe, Denton, and Barham, whose attitudes toward Darwinism have changed through their lives. Part IV, consisting of four essays, presents the authors' opinions on the consistency and scope of Darwinism.

The book's introduction characterizes Darwinism by the "central claim" that "an unguided physical process can account for the emergence of all biological complexity and diversity".<ref>Dembski, Uncommon Dissent, p. xx.</ref>

Contributor James Barham argues that "it is incorrect to simply equate Darwinism with belief in evolution." He distinguishes empirical Darwinism ("the idea that the formation of new species is due to random changes in individual organisms that happen to be 'selected' by the environment") from metaphysical Darwinism (the claim that "the theory of natural selection has successfully reduced all teleological and normative phenomena to the interplay of chance and necessity, thus eliminating purpose and value from our picture of the world").  For Barham, the "real problem with the evolution debate" is not empirical Darwinism, but a sort of "theory creep" in which a "bold but circumscribed scientific claim" (empirical Darwinism) becomes conflated with "a much more sweeping philosophical claim" (metaphysical Darwinism).

Robert C. Koons says in Uncommon Dissent that "if evolution is defined broadly enough, there's little doubt that it has occurred."  He sees the "defining differential element" of the modern synthesis as the view that "the probability of the occurrence of any mutation is unrelated to its prospective contribution to the functionality of any structure, present or future", and argues that "the natural presumption about the cause of life" lies against this view, and instead with a teleological "intelligent agency position".

Contributor Edward Sisson sees the key question in the debate over biological evolution as whether all life is "the result of chance events occurring in DNA (or perhaps elsewhere) that are then 'selected' in some fashion without the need of any guiding intelligence", thereby undergoing "unintelligent evolution", or whether at least some of the diversity of life on earth can be explained only through "intelligent evolution", in which "an intelligent designer (or designers)" causes preexisting species to undergo designed changes in DNA.  His view is that "no data has been found that amounts to real evidence for unintelligent evolution as the explanation for the diversity of life", that "science is ignorant of how the diversity of life came to be", and that "an intelligent cause is necessary to explain at least some of the diversity of life as we see it".

Reception by the scientific community
Evolution has broad acceptance within the scientific community,IAP Statement on the Teaching of Evolution  Joint statement issued by the national science academies of 67 countries, including the United Kingdom's Royal Society (PDF file) and that community rejects intelligent design, with critics such as Barbara Forrest and Paul R. Gross saying that design proponents seek to destroy evolution and that they employ intentional ambiguity and conflation in using "Darwinism" synonymously with evolution."In [Berlinski's] latest Commentary essay on 'Darwinism' - as it is often called by those who do not know much evolutionary biology..." Darwinism Versus Intelligent Design Paul Gross. Commentary Magazine, Vol. 115, March 2003, No. 3

Of Uncommon Dissent computational physicist and an assistant professor of physics Taner Edis writes: 

The testimony of Barbara Forrest in the 2005 Kitzmiller v. Dover Area School District trial  contributed to the ruling that intelligent design is not science and essentially religious in nature.  In her expert witness report Forrest presented Nancy R. Pearcey's section in Uncommon Dissent as evidence of that religious nature.

Evolutionary and historical researcher John M. Lynch describes Uncommon Dissent'':

Of the fifteen intellectuals in the book he says:

See also
Wedge strategy
Intelligent design movement
Teach the Controversy

References

External links
 "The Myths of Darwinism" - the book's introduction, by William Dembski
 "Evolution as Dogma: The Establishment of Naturalism" - Phillip E. Johnson's chapter
 "Refereed Journals: Do They Insure Quality or Enforce Orthodoxy?" - Frank Tipler's chapter
 Darwinian Evolutionary Theory and the Life Sciences in the 21st Century" - Roland F. Hirsch's chapter
 "The Deniable Darwin" - David Berlinski's chapter
 Review of Uncommon Dissent by Jason Rosenhouse
 Review of Uncommon Dissent by John M.  Lynch

2004 non-fiction books
Books by William A. Dembski
English-language books
Intelligent design books